County Carlow Football Club is a rugby club in Carlow, County Carlow, Ireland, playing in Division 1B of the Leinster League. The club was founded in October 1873, and is one of the oldest rugby clubs in Ireland. As was usual in the days preceding the development of Gaelic football and soccer and prior to the foundation of the Rugby Football Union, the earlier clubs were known simply as "football clubs" with no mention of rugby in the title. The County Carlow club was formed, therefore, (and is correctly known) as "County Carlow Football Club."

History
The club was constituted at a meeting in the Club House Hotel, Carlow in October 1873. It was to be known as the County Carlow Football Club. The founder, Colonel Horace Rochfort of Clogrennan, County Carlow, was elected the first president. The club colours were registered as black and amber. He was also the founder of the County Carlow Cricket Club in 1831, and the founder and first secretary of the All Ireland Polo Club in the Phoenix Park, Dublin, in 1873, having founded the County Carlow Polo Club in 1872.

County Carlow Football Club played unofficially for the first 25 years of its existence, with Trinity (Dublin University), Wanderers and Kingstown providing the most frequent early opposition. Fixtures with Bective and Lansdowne were recorded in the 1880s, and in the late 1880s the formation of Athy, Baltinglass, Carlow College (1882) and Portarlington College provided an alternative opposition to the Dublin clubs and heralded the early days of provincial rugby.

Affiliation of County Carlow FC to the Leinster Branch of the IRFU was achieved on 1 December 1899 when it was proposed by T.Thornhill of Wanderers and seconded by J.B. Moore of Lansdowne. Hence the club became eligible to compete in the Leinster Junior Challenge Cup, which they won in 1904, becoming the first provincial club to do so. County Carlow FC won the Junior Cup on four subsequent occasions before the competition was restructured to become the Provincial Towns Cup in 1926.

County Carlow FC have appeared in 16 finals of the Provincial Towns Cup and were victorious on 12 occasions - (the most appearances and the most wins by any club). In 1997, they became the first club ever to achieve the Provincial Cup and League double. The Provincial League win of that year earned them a place in the All Ireland Round Robin qualifier competition with Midleton (Munster), Connemara (Connaught) and Omagh Academicals (Ulster). County Carlow won the play off, and became a senior club for the first time in its history for the 1997/1998 season.

In 1997/1998 - their first season as a senior club - County Carlow FC won Division 4 of the All Ireland League. Promotion to Division 2 was achieved two years later, and by the end of the 2000/2001 season they attained Division 1 status, finishing second in Division 2 to UCD.

Historically, County Carlow FC won the Leinster Senior Cup in 2003, becoming the only club to have won both the Provincial Towns Cup and the Leinster Senior Cup. The win in 2003 was also the first time in the 120-year history of the competition that the Leinster Senior Cup was won by a non-Dublin club. This historic win was repeated in 2004 when County Carlow FC recorded back to back wins, beating DLS Palmerston in the final on both occasions.

County Carlow FC played for 5 consecutive seasons in Division 1 but were relegated to Division 2 for the 2006/2007 season and subsequently to Division 3 for the 2007/2008 season. The club currently plays in Division 1B of the Leinster Senior League.

Club honours
 Leinster Senior Cup (2) 2003, 2004
 AIB League Division 4 (1) 1998
 Navan 10-a-side (1) 2002
 Leinster Junior Challenge Cup (5) 1904, 1912, 1913, 1919, 1922
 Provincial Towns Cup (12) 1929, 1931, 1933, 1957, 1961, 1965, 1977, 1992, 1993, 1994, 1996, 1997
 Provincial Towns Plate (4) 1964, 1968, 1971, 1973
 South East Cup (8) 1975, 1976, 1985, 1988, 1990, 1991, 1992, 1996
 IRFU Award	Top Club in Leinster 1993
 IRFU Award	Top non-league club in Ireland 1997

References

External links
 County Carlow Football Club
 Carlow County Museum
 Irish Sporting Heritage

1873 in Ireland
Irish rugby union teams
Rugby clubs established in 1873
Rugby union clubs in County Carlow
Sport in Carlow (town)